English is an Unincorporated community in northeastern Red River County, Texas, USA,  northeast of Clarksville.

English was named after Oliver English and Simeon English, Oliver English's uncle. Oliver English bought land on what is now English in 1840. In 1852 Simeon English brought three families and thirty slaves to the area to establish plantations. In 1910 English had a reported population of 100. From 1920 to 2000 English had about 92 residents.

References

External links

Unincorporated communities in Red River County, Texas
Unincorporated communities in Texas